Sorkol may refer to:

Sorkol (village), a village in Kyzylkoga District, Kazakhstan
Sorkol (Chu basin), a lake in Sarysu District, Kazakhstan
Sorkol, Fyodorov District, a lake in the Kostanay Region, Kazakhstan

kk:Соркөл